Julius Joseph Awome (born 1953) is a retired English boxer.

Boxing career
He represented England and won a gold medal in the -91 kg heavyweight division, at the 1978 Commonwealth Games in Edmonton, Alberta, Canada.

Awome was the National Champion in 1978 after winning the prestigious ABA featherweight title, boxing out of Woking ABC.

References

1953 births
Living people
British male boxers
Boxers at the 1978 Commonwealth Games
Commonwealth Games medallists in boxing
Commonwealth Games gold medallists for England
Heavyweight boxers
Medallists at the 1978 Commonwealth Games